EchoStar XVI is an American geostationary communications satellite which is operated by EchoStar. It is positioned in geostationary orbit, and will be located at a longitude of 61.5° West, from where it is intended to provide direct broadcasting of high-definition television services to the United States for Dish Network.

EchoStar XVI was built by Space Systems/Loral, and is based on the LS-1300 satellite bus. It is equipped with 32 J band (IEEE Ku band) transponders. It has a design life of fifteen years. It has a common configuration with EchoStar XI and EchoStar XV.

The launch of EchoStar XVI was conducted by International Launch Services, using a Proton-M carrier rocket with a Briz-M upper stage. The launch occurred on 20 November 2012, 18:31 UTC from Site 200/39 at the Baikonur Cosmodrome in Kazakhstan.

The arts organization Creative Time launched an archival disc created by artist Trevor Paglen called The Last Pictures into orbit on EchoStar XVI. Made of ultra-archival materials, the disc is expected to orbit the planet Earth for millions of years and possibly up to several billion years affixed to the exterior of the communications satellite if left untouched. The silicon wafer disc, protected by a gold-plated aluminum cover bolted to the satellite's exterior, contains one hundred black-and-white photographs selected to represent the artist's take on modern human history.

See also

 EchoStar
 2012 in spaceflight

References

External links
"The Last Pictures: Contemporary Pessimism and Hope for the Future", by Larry Klaes, Centauri Dreams, January 18, 2013
"A Temporal Map in Geostationary Orbit: The Cover Etching on the EchoStar XVI Artifact", J. M. Weisberg, T. Paglen, Submitted on 22 August 2012

Spacecraft launched in 2012
Communications satellites in geostationary orbit
Satellites using the SSL 1300 bus
Spacecraft launched by Proton rockets
E16